Posner is a surname of German origin, meaning "a person from the city of Posen", now Poznań in Poland. It is a fairly common surname among Ashkenazi Jews. Variants of the name are Posener and Pozner. Notable people with the surname include:

Aaron Posner, American playwright and stage director
Barry Posner (disambiguation), multiple people
Carl Posner (1854–1928), German urologist
David M. Posner (1947–2018), American rabbi
David Posner, fictional character in the Alan Bennett play The History Boys
Ed Posner (1933–1993), American information theorist and neural network researcher 
Elieser Posner (born 1937), American grain scientist
Eric Posner (born 1965), American jurist and academic
Ernst Posner (1892–1980), Prussian state archivist 
Gary H. Posner (born 1943), American chemist
Geoff Posner (born 1949), British producer of television and radio comedy
Gerald Posner (born 1954), American journalist
Herbert A. Posner (born 1925), American politician
Jerome B. Posner, American neurologist
Kenneth Posner, American lighting designer
Lindsay Posner (born 1959), British theatre director
Michael Posner (disambiguation), multiple people
Neal Pozner (1955–1994), sometimes credited as Neil Pozner, art director, editor, and writer known for his work in the comic book industry
Rebecca Posner (1929–2018), British philologist, linguist and academic
Richard Posner (born 1939), prominent American judge and jurist
Ruth Posner (born 1933), Polish-born actress
Sarah Posner, American journalist
Seymour Posner (1925–1988), American politician 
Steven Posner (1943–2010), American corporate raider
Tracy Posner (born 1962), American actress, animal rights rescuer and activist
Trisha Posner, British non-fiction writer, wife of Gerald Posner
Victor Posner (1918–2002), American entrepreneur, father of Tracy
Vladimir Pozner (disambiguation), multiple people
Walter Posner (born 1953), German football player
Zalman I. Posner (1927–2014), American rabbi

See also
 Posener
 Posen

References